Rigg railway station was a railway station in Dumfries and Galloway between Eastriggs and Gretna, serving the small village of Rigg.

History 
The station opened circa 1904 as shown on Ordnance Survey maps. The station closed in 1942, although the line through the station is still open. The station's site has been destroyed by a bridge on the main A75 road. The houses nearby are named the 'Railway Cottages'.

References

Notes

Sources
 
 RAILSCOT on Glasgow, Dumfries and Carlisle Railway

Disused railway stations in Dumfries and Galloway
Former Glasgow and South Western Railway stations
Railway stations in Great Britain opened in 1904
Railway stations in Great Britain closed in 1942